Zegzel is a town in Berkane Province, Oriental, Morocco. It's located in the Aït Iznasen mountains .
According to the 2004 census it has a population of 32,210.

References

Populated places in Berkane Province
Rural communes of Oriental (Morocco)